The Quinjet is a fictional vehicle appearing in American comic books published by Marvel Comics. Quinjets also appear in films produced by Marvel Studios.

Publication history

The quinjet first appeared in The Avengers #61 (February 1969).

Description
The quinjet is used primarily by the Avengers.

The quinjet was first designed by the Wakanda Design Group, headed by the Black Panther, T'Challa. Each one is equipped with VTOL capability and five turbojet engines. Two highly specialized ultra-large Quinjets were used to transport various superheroes through space in the Infinity Crusade mini-series.

Reception
 In 2021, CBR.com ranked the Quinjet 8th in their "10 Most Important Vehicles In The Marvel Universe" list.
 In 2022, CBR.com ranked the Quinjet 9th in their "10 Coolest Vehicles In Marvel Comics" list.

In other media
Quinjets have made appearances in the animated series Avengers: Earth's Mightiest Heroes by Disney XD. A larger, stylized Quinjet-like aircraft known as the Avenjet appears in the subsequent series Avengers Assemble, as the Avengers' personal transport vehicle.

The Quinjet appeared in The Avengers, Captain America: The Winter Soldier and Agents of S.H.I.E.L.D. as an aircraft carrier-compatible VTOL utility aircraft used primarily by S.H.I.E.L.D. A larger version appears in Avengers: Age of Ultron and Captain America: Civil War as an aircraft for the Avengers. The Quinjet from Avengers: Age of Ultron appears again in Thor: Ragnarok having brought the Hulk to the planet Sakaar.

References

Avengers (comics)
Fictional aircraft
Marvel Comics vehicles